Blizzard Entertainment released several computer-generated cinematic trailers and teasers, as well as animated shorts, to promote and develop the story for their 2016 first-person shooter video game, Overwatch. The shorts have been met with positive reception from fans and online publications alike.

Plot and setting

Overwatch is set in a fictionalized version of Earth, sixty years into the future; the Overwatch organization was established thirty years prior to this future setting. These pre-game events are also chronicled by Soldier: 76 in his origin story video.

The story of Overwatch begins with the in-universe "Omnic Crisis" event; the event's cause is unknown. However, prior to the event, humanity developed omnics, artificial intelligence (AI) that led efforts in creating global economic equality and manufacturing. These AI bots were soon developed by omniums, large facilities designed specifically for their creation. Eventually, the world's omniums began producing hostile omnics that attacked humans; the United Nations (UN) established a task force called Overwatch, composed of soldiers and scientists, in response to this Omnic Crisis. Overwatch was originally led by Gabriel Reyes and Jack Morrison, who are known in the game as Reaper and Soldier: 76, respectively. Morrison's battlefield success helped him take control of Overwatch from Reyes, relegating Reyes to lead Blackwatch, a covert operations division of Overwatch. The Omnic Crisis would eventually end, with Overwatch subsequently presiding over a period of maintained peace; those born in this period would be called the "Overwatch Generation". After a few decades, Overwatch would soon face allegations of corruption, mismanagement, weapons proliferation, and human rights abuses, among others, leading to worldwide protests against the organization. Infighting between Reyes and Morrison also occurred; during a UN investigation of Overwatch, a fight broke out at Overwatch's headquarters, leading to an explosion, which destroyed the building and supposedly killed both Reyes and Morrison. The UN would soon pass a resolution that declared any act in the name of Overwatch illegal. This resolution, dubbed the Petras Act, was signed six years prior to the game's setting. In the Soldier: 76 Origin Story animation, Morrison accounts that the allegations against Overwatch were part of a conspiracy.

Following this back story are five of the first six animated shorts (the exception is Dragons, which takes place during the era in which Overwatch maintained peace), as well as the first cinematic trailer.

Characters

Background and development

Overwatchs animated media is interconnected, taking place in the same continuity. Through this animated media, in conjunction with comics and fictional news reports, Blizzard developed the story of Overwatch, rather than including it in the video game. Within the video game, the story is instead "hinted at through environments and character quips, with each individual personality reacting to the events of the battle in their own way," as Kirk McKeand of The Telegraph detailed.

Jeff Chamberlain, the director of the initial Overwatch cinematic trailer, revealed that Blizzard opted to develop their storytelling through this unconventional method because, "A long time ago we [realized Overwatch] doesn't have a linear storyline, like other games we do," adding that "[Blizzard] has been doing storytelling outside of the game, for Draenor and Legacy of the Void, so we have a precedent for short animations outside the game." Chamberlain said that they "wanted to create a lot of stories as quickly as we could", and in conjunction with making the cinematic release trailer, found the animated shorts to be best way to present these stories. While they were initially focused on exposition with the first shorts, further shorts are more focused on developing these characters and other stories, rather than driving to any narrative conclusion. When these stories have multiple characters involved, Blizzard may opt to instead create a digital comic.

The animated shorts take between six and eight months to complete from storyboarding to rendering, and there are usually two to three shorts in the production line. The animation team sometimes works in conjunction with the art and level design teams; Chamberlain said that the "Watchpoint: Gibraltar" map was developed simultaneously with the Recall short which took place at that location, and the animation and level design team worked to incorporate the assets and ideas developed by the other team. 
To further develop the game's story, Blizzard released short videos that include animated stills with narrated voice-overs, such as the aforementioned Soldier: 76 Origin Story video. In addition, Blizzard released A Moment in Crime Special Report: "The Junkers", which was a fake news report chronicling the criminal activities caused by Junkrat and Roadhog. Ana was the first character added to the game post-release; beginning with her, each new character has had their addition to the game's playable roster accompanied by a short origin story video. Blizzard used an animated short Junkertown: The Plan, starring Junkrat and Roadhog, to introduce the new Junkertown map for the game during the 2017 Gamescom.

Overwatchs lead designer Jeff Kaplan considers The Last Bastion as the last installment of the first season of animated Overwatch shorts; he detailed: "We think of them as in seasons. That's how we [Blizzard Entertainment] talk about them internally. So our first season started with Recall and ended with The Last Bastion." In 2017, Kaplan stated that a debut for a second season was "making good progress," although the Infiltration short had premiered at BlizzCon 2016, between The Last Bastion and his comments. Kaplan also stated that after the animation team had produced so many shorts in 2016; as a result, the team opted to slow down to prevent burnout, explaining the limited number of shorts in 2017 and 2018.

Release
Prior to Overwatchs release, Blizzard released the cinematic teasers We Are Overwatch and Are You With Us?, which featured voice-overs of the game's characters. In the latter, Winston briefly summarizes the Omnic Crisis and recall of Overwatch. Blizzard released their first of the original four animated shorts, Recall, in March 2016. While the PlayOverwatch YouTube channel uploaded the short on March 23, the Xbox YouTube channel premiered it on March 21. The events of Recall precede the events of the cinematic trailer. 

Although Blizzard initially announced four animated shorts, a fifth short titled The Last Bastion was announced in August 2016. The short was debuted at Gamescom 2016 and simultaneously streamed on Blizzard.com on August 18. It was also released on the PlayOverwatch YouTube channel on the same day.

Following The Last Bastion, Blizzard continued to release animated cinematic shorts; the release of these shorts often coincided with new character additions to Overwatch, and the shorts often premiered at gaming conventions such as BlizzCon, Gamescom, or TwitchCon. 

On November 1, 2019, at that year's BlizzCon event, Zero Hour premiered. The short functioned as announcement cinematic for Overwatch 2. Kiriko premiered on October 7, 2022, as part of TwitchCon and included a deaf child character as a nod to a deaf Overwatch player who developed American sign language gestures for each of the heroes in the game. The Kiriko short featured the song "BOW" by Japanese artist MFS.

Animated media

Overwatch shorts (2014–2018)

Cinematic trailer (2014)

Season 1 (2016)

Season 2 (2016–2018)

Overwatch 2 shorts (2019–present)

Other animations

Reception
Media outlets often positively received the Overwatch animations, and in a broader sense the story as a whole. Various outlets including The Telegraph, The Mary Sue, and The Daily Beast have all likened Blizzard's animations to Pixar's films.

Mike Fahey of Kotaku expressed that he was also "charmed by [the] beautifully animated trailer." Nick Schager of The Daily Beast praised the cinematic teaser, which is also seen when the game is first loaded up, expressing that "the charisma of these avatars is established early on, in an introductory video featuring hyper-intelligent simian warrior Winston that establishes the game's Earth-under-siege sci-fi premise – and proves to be a tour-de-force of digital animation. It's no exaggeration to say that Winston feels like he's leapt out of a Pixar film (or a similarly gorgeous Disney effort like Big Hero 6)."

Jessica Lachenal of The Mary Sue praised the tone and music of the Recall short, writing "The short itself is so incredibly well done," adding "It's full of heart, and it's already got me invested in the featured character, Winston. I found myself getting a bit misty-eyed at his flashbacks, as well. Thanks, emotionally epic, dramatic score." Lachenal also wrote that the Dragons short was "filled with gorgeous animations and some pretty sweet action sequences." The Telegraph concurred, describing Dragons as a "beautiful, Pixar-esque" short. Writing about The Last Bastion, Nick Statt of The Verge stated "While other Overwatch shorts have done a stellar job providing world-building backstories, "The Last Bastion" — as it's called — is more emotional powerhouse than plot point delivery."

When discussing the shorts in general, Lachenal opined "[Blizzard has] a real knack for applying a fantastic cinematic tilt to these shorts, and every time I catch one, I find myself intrigued and —perhaps most of all —invested in the world that they're building. Gabe Gurwin of Digital Trends, while agreeing that the Blizzard released "a number of fantastic computer-animated short films," was critical of their decision to exclude the story from the game.

The Overwatch Announcement Cinematic won a People's Choice Webby Award in 2015 for Best Editing. The Last Bastion won the People's Choice 2017 Webby Award for Best Writing in the Film & Video category. That same year, the Webby Awards named the first season of animated shorts as an Honoree in the Animation (Branded) category.

Notes

References

Primary video sources
In the text these references are preceded by a double dagger (‡):

2010s American animated films
2010s animated short films
2010s YouTube videos
2016 web series debuts
2020s YouTube videos
American animated short films
American computer-animated films
American animated web series
Blizzard Entertainment
Computer-animated short films
Films set in the 2070s
Overwatch
Transmedia storytelling